Helm is an unincorporated community in Fresno County, California.

The first post office was opened in Helm in 1913. The ZIP code is 93627.

The city was name after William Helm, the largest individual sheep farmer who arrived in Fresno, California in 1877.

References

Unincorporated communities in California
Unincorporated communities in Fresno County, California
Chicano and Mexican neighborhoods in California